|}

The Diamond Stakes is a Listed flat horse race in Ireland open to thoroughbreds aged three years or older. It is run at Dundalk over a distance of 1 mile, 2 furlongs and 150 yards (2,149 metres), and it is scheduled to take place each year in September or October.

History
The event was formerly classed at Listed level and contested on turf over 1 mile and 2 furlongs. For a period it was held at Phoenix Park, and it switched to the Curragh in 1991. It used to be restricted to fillies and mares, but it was opened to male horses in 2001. It was staged at Fairyhouse in 2006 and 2007.

The Diamond Stakes moved to Dundalk in 2008, and since then it has been run on a Polytrack surface over 1 mile, 2 furlongs and 150 yards. It became Ireland's first non-turf Group race in 2009, when it was promoted to Group 3 status. It was downgraded back to Listed status in 2022.

The Diamond Stakes was added to the Breeders' Cup Challenge series in 2009, with the winner earning an automatic invitation to compete in the Breeders' Cup Marathon. It was removed from the series in 2011.

Records
Most successful horse since 1988:
 no horse has won this race more than once since 1988

Leading jockey since 1988 (5 wins):
 Kevin Manning – Ballykett Nancy (1994), Darina (1998), Dolydille (2000), Napper Tandy (2003), Parish Hall (2013)

Leading trainer since 1988 (8 wins):
 Aidan O'Brien – Mikado (2004), Mountain (2006), Mastercraftsman (2009), Freedom (2011), Declaration of War (2012), Long Island Sound (2016), War Decree (2017), Blenheim Palace (2019)

Winners since 1988

See also
 Horse racing in Ireland
 List of Irish flat horse races

References

 Racing Post:

External links
 galopp-sieger.de – Diamond Stakes.
 ifhaonline.org – International Federation of Horseracing Authorities – Diamond Stakes (2019).
 pedigreequery.com – Diamond Stakes.

Flat races in Ireland
Open middle distance horse races
Dundalk Stadium